Bitchotchi is a sub-prefecture of Guéra Region in Chad.

Demographics 
Ethnic composition by canton in 2016:

Moubi Hadaba Canton (population: 32,135; villages: 58):

References 

Populated places in Chad